Ghost of the Salt Water Machines is the second full-length album from American hardcore band Architect.  It was released on Black Market Activities on November 25, 2008. Ghost of the Salt Water Machines was also the name of the band prior to changing to Architect.

Track listing

References 

2008 albums
Architect (band) albums
Black Market Activities albums